Charlcutt is a hamlet in the county of Wiltshire, England,  northwest of Calne.  It is part of the civil parish of Bremhill.

Charlcutt is home to twenty households spread over an area of one mile along the ridge of the hill. Unusually, Charlcutt House is situated at the bottom of the hill, beneath the other dwellings. There are no religious buildings with the nearest chapel a mile away in neighbouring Spirthill (now converted into a home).

Hamlets in Wiltshire